Improbable is a 2005 science fiction thriller novel by Adam Fawer, about a gambler who gains the power to predict the future. It was awarded the 2006 International Thriller Writers Award for best first novel.

Plot summary
Improbable is the story of a gifted young man named David Caine, who has been troubled by debilitating epileptic seizures to the extent that his medical condition has thrown his life completely off track.  He is a compulsive gambler, and heavily in debt to the local mafia.

During the course of the novel, Caine undergoes an experimental medical treatment in an attempt to set his life straight.  After the procedure, he discovers that he is able to make predictions using his enhanced calculative skills, and change the future based on his discoveries. However, shadowy forces want to use his power for their own ends, and he faces a desperate battle for survival.

3-D cover 
A major aspect of the book which has received a good deal of praise is the unique cover art, which features a lenticular three-dimensional image which shifts as the book is moved in relation to the viewer.

Characters
David Caine
Jasper Caine
Nava Vaner
Dr. "Doc" Paul Tversky
James Forsythe 
Steven Grimes
Martin Crowe
Julia Pearlman 
Peter Hanneman
Vitaly Nikolaev 
Sergey Kozlov 
Yi EGG

References

External links
 Reviews

2005 American novels
2005 science fiction novels
Techno-thriller novels
American science fiction novels